Stefan Höck (born 10 May 1963 in Benediktbeuern, Upper Bavaria) is a former German biathlete who represented West Germany at the 1988 Olympics in Calgary. Höck won a silver medal with the West German relay team that consisted of Ernst Reiter, Peter Angerer and Fritz Fischer.

References 

1963 births
Living people
People from Bad Tölz-Wolfratshausen
Sportspeople from Upper Bavaria
German male biathletes
Biathletes at the 1988 Winter Olympics
Olympic medalists in biathlon
Olympic biathletes of West Germany
Olympic silver medalists for West Germany
Medalists at the 1988 Winter Olympics